Adrián Álvarez (born 5 March 1968) is a retired Argentine football midfielder.

References

External links
 

1968 births
Living people
Argentine footballers
Sportivo Italiano footballers
Club de Gimnasia y Esgrima La Plata footballers
Club Atlético Colón footballers
Deportivo Morón footballers
Huracán Corrientes footballers
Club Atlético Belgrano footballers
Arsenal de Sarandí footballers
Club Atlético Banfield footballers
Independiente Rivadavia footballers
Club Atlético Temperley footballers
The Strongest players
Monagas S.C. players
Deportivo Táchira F.C. players
A.C.C.D. Mineros de Guayana players
Boca Unidos footballers
Sportivo Patria footballers
Club Atlético San Miguel footballers
Bolivian Primera División players
Association football midfielders
Argentine expatriate footballers
Expatriate footballers in Bolivia
Argentine expatriate sportspeople in Bolivia
Expatriate footballers in Venezuela
Argentine expatriate sportspeople in Venezuela
People from San Martín, Buenos Aires
Sportspeople from Buenos Aires Province
Crucero del Norte managers